The Hondita Formation (Ksh) is a fossiliferous geological formation of the Upper Magdalena Valley (VSM) and surrounding Central and Eastern Ranges of the Colombian Andes, extending from Cundinamarca in the north to Huila and easternmost Tolima in the south.

Fossils of Yaguarasaurus columbianus, said to be found in the time-equivalent La Frontera Formation (listed as "La Frontera Member"), were actually recovered from the Hondita Formation as the stratigraphic unit present in the Quebradas El Ocal and Itaibe, Huila.

Etymology 
The formation was named in 1966 by De Porta, named after Quebrada Hondita in Piedras, Tolima.

Description

Lithologies 
The formation has provided fossils of Pachyrhizodus etayoi, Acanthoceras sp., Rhynchostreon sp. near Aipe, Huila.

Stratigraphy and depositional environment 
The Hondita Formation is the lowermost unit of the Güagüaquí Group. It is overlain by the Loma Gorda Formation and its base has not been observed. The age has been estimated on the basis of ammonites to be Turonian. Stratigraphically, the formation is time equivalent with the lower parts of the Chipaque, La Luna and La Frontera Formations. The formation was deposited in a relative highstand sequence with an oceanic oxygen depletion event, sharply marked in Colombia and characterised by the appearance of calcareous concretions with a thick pyrite rim.

Yaguarasaurus 

Outcrops 

The type locality of the Hondita Formation is located in Piedras, Tolima. Other outcrops of the Hondita Formation have been noted east of the Magdalena River northeast of Honda, west of Nariño, west across the Magdalena River in San Luis, Tolima, between the Tetuán and Saldaña Rivers west of Coyaima and east and west of Ataco, to the east of the Prado River reservoir, north and west of Aipe, surrounding Alpujarra, Tolima, south of Palermo, Huila, displaced by the Baché Fault, east of Iquira, north of Yaguará, south of La Plata where the formation is cut by the Itaibe Fault, a small patch east of Gigante, Huila, northwest and northeast of San Agustín, and north of Timaná surrounding the Magdalena River.

Regional correlations

See also 

 Geology of the Eastern Hills
 Geology of the Ocetá Páramo
 Geology of the Altiplano Cundiboyacense
 Geology of the Middle Magdalena Valley

References

Bibliography

Maps

External links 
 

Geologic formations of Colombia
Cretaceous Colombia
Upper Cretaceous Series of South America
Turonian Stage
Limestone formations
Shale formations
Open marine deposits
Fossiliferous stratigraphic units of South America
Paleontology in Colombia
Formations
Formations
Formations
Magdalena River